Tilda's yellow-shouldered bat (Sturnira tildae) is a bat species found in Bolivia, Brazil, Colombia, Ecuador, French Guiana, Guyana, Peru, Suriname, Venezuela, and Trinidad and Tobago.

References

Bats of South America
Bats of Brazil
Mammals of Colombia
Sturnira
Mammals described in 1959